Wolbórz  is a town in Piotrków County, Łódź Voivodeship, in central Poland. It is the seat of the administrative district (gmina) called Gmina Wolbórz.

Wolbórz has a population of 2,301, as of 2020. It was granted town charter in 1273, but was downgraded to a village in 1870 as a consequence of the January Uprising (1863–1864). It regained its city rights on 1 January 2011.

History
According to archaeologists, first human settlements appeared in today Wolbórz in c. 4000 BC. In early times of the Kingdom of Poland, Wolbórz emerged as a center of local administrative unit called opole, which was later turned into a castellany. In the 1120s, Wolbórz became one of seats of Bishops of Kuyavia. By that time, it already was an important trade center, which was confirmed in 1273, when Wolbórz was granted a town charter by Duke Leszek II the Black.

In 1357, the charter of Wolbórz was modeled after more modern Magdeburg rights, and the town was so important, that it had a branch of the Cracow Academy, with a rector, six professors and permission to grant academic titles. On September 9, 1409, King Władysław II Jagiełło issued here an appeal to Polish clergy and nobility, urging them to fight the Teutonic Knights. Also, knights from Lesser Poland, Podolia and Red Ruthenia concentrated here before the Battle of Grunwald. King Jagiello visited Wolbórz as many as 15 times, other Polish rulers also came to the town, especially when Crown Tribunal was held in nearby Piotrków Trybunalski.

In the 15th and 16th centuries Wolbórz prospered. The town was a large trade and artisan center, with a number of workshops, breweries and mills. In 1521, Wolbórz had the population of 3000, with five churches , three synagogues, three hospitals, 400 houses, a town hall, bishop’s castle with Italian garden, and 259 artisans. In 1536 and 1548, the town was burned in fires. In 1544, St. Nicholas church was turned into a collegiate, and in 1553, Andrzej Frycz Modrzewski was named the local wójt (Modrzewski was born here in 1503).

The period of prosperity ended in the 17th century. In 1618, Wolbórz burned in a fire; in 1655, the town was ransacked by Swedish soldiers; and in 1671, the town burned again. After these calamities, Wolbórz never recovered.

Following the Partitions of Poland and the Congress of Vienna, Wolbórz since 1815 belonged to Russian-controlled Congress Poland. In 1870, following the January Uprising, it lost its town charter. In 1892, its population was 3000, including 700 Jews.

Among main sights are: complex of park and palace of Bishops of Kuyavia, St. Nicholas collegiate, 19th-century synagogue, cemeteries, 19th-century tenement houses, and remains of bishophoric castle (14th century).

Personalities
 Andrzej Frycz Modrzewski (Andreas Fricius Modrevius, 1503–1572), a Polish Renaissance scholar, humanist and theologian

References

Cities and towns in Łódź Voivodeship
Piotrków County
Piotrków Governorate